Movement may refer to:

Common uses 

 Movement (clockwork), the internal mechanism of a timepiece
 Motion, commonly referred to as movement

Arts, entertainment, and media

Literature 

 "Movement" (short story), a short story by Nancy Fulda
 The Movement (comics), a comic book by Gail Simone and Freddie Williams II
 "Movement (운동, 運動)", a poem by Yi-sang

Music

Groups and labels 

 Movement (band), an Australian soul/ambient band
 Movements (band), an American post-hardcore band

Albums and EPs 

 Movement (9mm Parabellum Bullet album)
 Movement (EP), an EP by The Fray
 Movement, an EP by BT
 Movement (Holly Herndon album)
 Movement (Joe Harriott album), or the title track
 Movement (Inhale Exhale album)
 Movement (New Order album)
 Movement (The Gossip album)
 Movements (album), by Booka Shade

Songs 

 "Movement" (LCD Soundsystem song), 2004
 "Movement" (Kompany song), 2019
"Movement" (Hozier song), 2019
 "Movement", a 1998 song by The Black Eyed Peas from Behind the Front, 1998
 "Movement", by Jamie Woon from Making Time, 2015
 "Movement", by Club 8 from Pleasure, 2015
 "Movement", by Bobby Hutcherson from Components, 1965

Other uses in music 

 Movement (music), a large division of a larger composition or musical notes
 Movement (music festival), the Detroit Electronic Music Festival

Languages 

 Movement (sign language), the direction and nature of the movement of the hands when signing 
 Syntactic movement, a phenomenon in some theories of grammar within linguistics

Society and culture 

 Art movement, a tendency or style in art with a specific common philosophy or goal, followed by a group of artists during a restricted period of time
 Environmental movement, an international movement, represented by a range of organizations, from enterprises to grassroots and varies from country to country
 Political movement, a coordinated group action focused on a political issue or ideology
 Social movement, a coordinated group action focused on a social issue
 Religious movement, a coordinated group action focused on a religious ideology

Other uses 

 Motor planning, the process by which a person anticipates and implements the movement of the body

See also 
 
 
 Motion (disambiguation)
 Motor system
 Move (disambiguation)
 Movmnt (magazine)
 Progress (disambiguation)
 The Movement (disambiguation)
 Trend (disambiguation)